Cambodian Sign Language (CBDSL) is an indigenous deaf sign language of Cambodia.

History
Little is known of the language situation prior to the first Cambodian school for the deaf being established in the capital of Phnom Penh in 1997. Although the language of education is American Sign Language, modified to follow Khmer word order, the Deaf community of Phnom Penh has developed their language with the support of the Maryknoll Deaf Development Programme.

Classification
CBDSL shares about 40% of basic vocabulary with Modern Thai Sign Language (MTSL). What intelligibility there is with American Sign Language, apart from iconic elements, is due to vocabulary that is shared among CBDSL, MTSL and ASL. No connection with other languages of neighboring countries has been noted.

References

Relevant publications 
Harrelson, Erin Moriarty. "Deaf people with “no language”: Mobility and flexible accumulation in languaging practices of deaf people in Cambodia." Applied Linguistics Review 10, no. 1 (2019): 55-72.
Woodward, James, Anastasia Bradford, Chea Sokchea, and Heang Samath. "Cambodian Sign Language." In Sign Languages of the World, pp. 159-176. De Gruyter Mouton, 2015.

Sign language isolates
Languages of Cambodia